Uptown Girls is a 2003 American comedy-drama film directed by Boaz Yakin, from a screenplay by Julia Dahl, Mo Ogrodnik and Lisa Davidowitz adapted from the story by Allison Jacobs. It stars Brittany Murphy as a 22-year-old living a charmed life as the daughter of a famous rock and roll musician. Dakota Fanning, Heather Locklear, Marley Shelton, Donald Faison and Jesse Spencer also feature in the film.

Plot
Molly Gunn is a fun-loving, free-spirited young woman who lives off the ample trust fund of her late rock legend father, Tommy Gunn. Molly falls for singer Neal Fox when he plays at her birthday party thrown by her best friends, Huey and Ingrid. They share a night of passion, but he leaves in the morning, saying that he cannot stay in Molly's life. Adding to her misfortune, she discovers that her father's accountant embezzled all her money, leaving her penniless and homeless. She moves in with Ingrid, who tells her that in order to stay with her, she must find a job.

Molly begins working as a nanny for an eight-year-old hypochondriac named Lorraine "Ray" Schleine, who is the daughter of Roma Schleine, a music executive who is too busy to notice Ray. Ray's father is in a coma and is being treated at home by a private nurse which causes Ray to stifle her emotions to maintain order. Although she enjoys ballet, she refuses to freestyle and often quotes Mikhail Baryshnikov: "Fundamentals are the building blocks of fun." Molly attempts to show her how to have fun, which at first causes much conflict between them, but eventually Ray opens up to let Molly in.

Molly continues to pursue Neal and holds onto his lucky jacket in hopes of seeing him again. After a baking accident, Molly causes a fire that damages Neal's jacket. She redesigns it to fix the damage, but Neal breaks up with Molly when he sees it, insisting he has to focus on his music career and does not have time for her flightiness. Soon after, he lands a record deal with Roma and has a hit music video with a song that Molly inspired him to write, all while wearing the jacket Molly made. Disgusted, Molly agrees to Ingrid's suggestions to sell off her possessions so she can prove that she is growing up. However, after a fight, Ingrid kicks Molly out, and Molly goes to live with Huey. One night, after fighting with and feeling hurt by Neal again, Molly spends the night with Ray after feeling alone at Huey's apartment and finds Neal one morning, having slept with Roma.

The budding friendship between Molly and Ray continues to develop when Molly takes Ray to Coney Island and explains that when her parents died, she ran away to Coney Island and rode the tea cups. She encourages Ray to talk to her comatose father, and promises that it will help him improve. However, Ray's father dies the next day, and Ray tells Roma to fire Molly. In Roma's office, Molly calls Roma out for never paying attention to her daughter. As she leaves, Molly runs into Neal, who begs for a reconciliation as she was his whole inspiration. Molly turns him down and admonishes him for only caring about her when it is convenient for him. Ray runs away from home and Roma begs Molly to find her. Molly finds Ray at Coney Island, riding in the tea cups. Despite being furious with Molly for raising her hopes, she collapses into Molly's arms, crying, finally coming to terms with her grief.

Molly, deciding to take charge of her own life, takes Ray's advice to auction off her late father's guitar collection to an unknown buyer; this enables her to afford her own place. At the wake for Ray's father, Molly meets other musicians who ask her to design their clothes after seeing Neal's jacket in his video. She and Ingrid also make amends and Molly finds Ray to apologize as well. She promises to stay friends with Ray and enrolls in design school after realizing her talent for fashion.

Molly arrives at Ray's recital late and is pleased to see Ray is wearing the tutu Molly designed for her earlier. She is surprised when Ray dances freestyle to Neal singing "Molly Smiles", a song written for her by her father when she was a child. He plays using Tommy Gunn's acoustic guitar, while the remaining ballerinas dance with the other guitars from her father's collection, revealing that he was the anonymous buyer. In a voice-over, Ray says that the end was a new beginning for all of them.

Cast

Reception
The film opened at number five at the US box office, grossing US$11,277,367 in its opening weekend.

Uptown Girls was panned by critics, with Rotten Tomatoes giving it a 13% rating based on 112 reviews with the consensus: "With two obnoxious lead characters and an uneven screenplay, Uptown Girls fails to charm." A positive review came from Roger Ebert, who awarded the film three stars out of four and likened Murphy to Lucille Ball.

Following Brittany Murphy's death at the age of 32 on December 20, 2009, Dakota Fanning, at age 15, stated that she cherished the time they spent together while working on the film, and that she was "very grateful that [she] had the chance to work with [Murphy]."

Accolades

The film won and was nominated for a number of awards throughout 2004.

Home media
Uptown Girls was released to VHS and DVD in Region 1 on January 6, 2004.

References

External links
 
 
 
 Reviews – Uptown Girls

2003 films
2003 comedy-drama films
2000s buddy comedy-drama films
2000s coming-of-age comedy-drama films
2000s English-language films
2000s female buddy films
American buddy comedy-drama films
American coming-of-age comedy-drama films
American female buddy films
Films about nannies
Films directed by Boaz Yakin
Films scored by Joel McNeely
Films set in New York City
Films shot in New York City
Metro-Goldwyn-Mayer films
2000s American films